Schmeling is a German surname. Notable people with the surname include:

 Karsten Schmeling (born 1962), German rower
 Max Schmeling (1905–2005), German boxer
 Migel Schmeling (born 2000), German footballer

Other uses
 Joe Louis vs. Max Schmeling, boxing competition
 Max Schmeling (film), a 2010 German biographical film directed by Uwe Boll
 Max-Schmeling-Halle, an arena in Berlin, Germany.

German-language surnames